Sébastien Loeb is a French rally driver and a nine-time champion of the World Rally Championship. With 80 rally wins in the World Rally Championship, Loeb is the most successful rally driver in the history of the championship, alongside his co-driver Daniel Elena. Competing in his native France in the early parts of his career, Loeb later contested the World Rally Championship with the French Federation of Automobile Sport, between 1999 and 2000. For 2001, Loeb joined Citroën and was a Junior World Rally Champion with the team.

During 2002, Loeb won his first event in the World Rally Championship, winning the 2002 Rallye Deutschland ahead of the then-defending World Champion Richard Burns. He continued with Citroën in 2003 and won three rallies en route to second place in the championship. From 2004 to 2012, he won a further 72 rallies along with nine championships while driving for Citroën, except in 2006 when he drove for Kronos Citroën while Citroën were developing their World Rally Car for 2007 under a break from the series as a constructor. For the 2013 season, Loeb announced he would step down from full time rallying and only compete in four selected events before retiring from the World Rally Championship in 2014. He would go on to win two of them, taking his total number of wins to 78. He returned to the World Rally Championship in 2015 with Citroën to drive a single event, while in 2018 he would drive a further three events with the team. In his last event of the 2018 season, the 2018 Rally Catalunya, he scored his latest win when he beat Sébastien Ogier to the win. Between 2019 and 2020, he drove selected events for Hyundai but scored no wins for the team.

Loeb holds several records in the World Rally Championship, in addition to his record 80 wins. He became the most successful driver when he won the 2006 Rally Japan, his 27th win. In 2005, he became the first, and so far only, driver to score six wins in a row, he would also repeat the same feat between the last event of 2008 and first five rallies of 2009. He is also the driver with most wins in the same season, winning eleven rallies in 2008. Loeb has won both Rallye Deutschland and Rally Catalunya nine times each, which is a record for most wins in the same rally. In total, Loeb has been victorious at 23 different rallies, which is also a record.

Wins

Key:
 No. – Victory number; for example, "1" signifies Loeb's first rally win.
 Rally – Rally number in Loeb's World Rally Championship career; for example "25" signifies Loeb's 25th World Rally Championship rally.
 Stage surface – The surface, or surfaces if many, the stages of the rally took place on.
 Stage wins – The amount of stages won by Loeb during the event.
 Margin – Margin of victory, given in the format of minutes:seconds.milliseconds
  – Driver's Championship winning season.

Number of wins at different rallies

Notes 
 Loeb provisionally won the 2002 Monte Carlo Rally, but was later docked two minutes for an illegal tyre change and demoted to second place.
 Loeb also provisionally won the 2009 Rally Australia, but was penalised one minute to second place as his car was fitted with a non-regulation part.

References

Loeb
Sébastien Loeb
World Rally Championship–related lists